The 2004 Winnipeg Blue Bombers finished in 4th place in the West Division with a 7–11 record and failed to make the playoffs.

Offseason

CFL Draft

Regular season

Season standings

Season schedule

Awards and records
CFL's Most Outstanding Special Teams Award – Keith Stokes (WR)

2004 CFL All-Stars
 RB – Charles Roberts, CFL All-Star
 ST – Keith Stokes, CFL All-Star

Western All-Star selections
RB – Charles Roberts, CFL Western All-Star
ST – Keith Stokes, CFL Western All-Star
DE – Tom Canada, CFL Western All-Star
DB – Wes Lysack, CFL Western All-Star

References

Winnipeg Blue Bombers
Winnipeg Blue Bombers seasons
Winnipeg Blue Bombers